A federal district is a type of administrative division of a federation, usually under the direct control of a federal government and organized sometimes with a single municipal body. Federal districts often include capital districts, and they exist in various federations worldwide.

Countries

Current

Brazil 
The term , meaning Federal District in Portuguese, is used to refer to:

Federal District (Brazil), where the Brazilian capital Brasília is located.

India 
In India, the term Union Territory is used for the eight territories governed directly by the central government with its own Chief minister and Lieutenant Governor: Andaman and Nicobar Islands, Chandigarh, Dadra and Nagar Haveli and Daman and Diu, Delhi, Jammu and Kashmir, Ladakh, Lakshadweep and Puducherry. Of these, Delhi and Puducherry possess partial statehood with their own elected chief ministers.

Malaysia 
In Malaysia, the term Federal Territory (Wilayah Persekutuan) is used for the three territories governed directly by the federal government: Kuala Lumpur (national capital), Putrajaya (federal government administrative centre) and Labuan (international offshore financial centre).

Nigeria 
The Federal Capital Territory is a federal territory in central Nigeria. Abuja, the capital city of Nigeria, is located in this territory. The Federal Capital Territory was formed in 1976 from parts of the states of Nasarawa, Niger and Kogi. It is within in the Middle Belt region of the country. It is administered by the Federal Capital Territory Administration, headed by a minister appointed by the President.

Pakistan 
In Pakistan, the term Federal Territory is used for the five zones and 12 union councils of Islamabad governed directly by the state government as Islamabad Capital Territory.

Russia 
Russia has three cities of federal importance, established by the Constitution — Moscow, Saint Petersburg and Sevastopol (internationally recognised as part of Ukraine, administered by Russia). Each city is treated as a separate federal subject and has its own legislative body. Russia has federal districts, but these form an additional administrative layer between the federation government and the federal subjects rather than being a distinct type of jurisdiction.

United States 
The seat of the U.S. federal government in Washington is located in a federal district called the District of Columbia. Other federally administered areas that are within one of the 50 states, but not under its jurisdiction, are called federal enclaves.

Additionally, the U.S. federal court system divides each state, the District of Columbia, and Puerto Rico into one or more federal judicial districts. A United States district court and a bankruptcy court are located in each. There are also regional federal judicial circuits, each consisting of a group of states (except for the District of Columbia Circuit, which consists of the federal district, and the Federal Circuit, whose jurisdiction is based on specific subject matter instead of geography); Puerto Rico and the United States territorial courts are also assigned to circuits. Each circuit has a United States court of appeals.

Venezuela 
Capital District (Venezuela), where the Venezuelan capital Caracas is located.

Former

Argentina 
Federal District (Argentina) was converted into the Autonomous City of Buenos Aires in 1994.

Australia 
The Jervis Bay Territory is an internal territory of the Commonwealth of Australia, surrendered by the state of New South Wales in 1915 to the Commonwealth Government so that the landlocked Australian Capital Territory would have maritime access.  Due to the terms of the Jervis Bay Territory Acceptance Act, the laws of the ACT apply to the Jervis Bay Territory, and it was administered by the Department of the Interior (and later by the Department of the Capital Territory) as if it were part of the Australian Capital Territory, although it has always been a separate Commonwealth territory.  In 1989, when the ACT achieved self-government, the Department of the Arts, Sport, the Environment, Tourism and Territories took over responsibility for the JBT's administration, and it has since been administered by various Commonwealth departments responsible to the Minister for Territories.

Mexico 
former Federal District (Mexico), was converted into Mexico City in January 2016.

See also 
 Direct-controlled municipality
 Federal territory
 Federated state

References

Districts
Types of administrative division